Obadiah Wills (1625 – ?) was a clergyman, theologian and paedobaptist best remembered for his critiques of John Bunyan's position on baptism.

Background
Obadiah Wills was the son of R Wills of Sherborne in Dorset. He was educated at Sherborne, and Exeter College, Oxford before becoming a Fellow of New College, Oxford.

References

Alumni of Exeter College, Oxford
People educated at Sherborne School
People from Dorset
1625 births
Date of birth unknown
Year of death missing
Place of death unknown
17th-century English theologians
17th-century English clergy
Fellows of New College, Oxford